D.200 is a west to east state road in Turkey. Since it runs all the way from west to east it crosses some north to south state roads such as D-555, D-565, D-575, D-160, D-650, D-675, D-260, D-750, D-765, D-785, D-795, D-805, D-850 and D-865.

Itinerary

External links 
İller Arası Mesafe (Distance finder)
KGM Turkish State Highway road map

AH1
200
Transport in Çanakkale Province
Transport in Balıkesir Province
Transport in Bursa Province
Transport in Bilecik Province
Transport in Eskişehir Province
Transport in Ankara Province
Transport in Kırıkkale Province
Transport in Yozgat Province
Transport in Sivas Province
Transport in Erzincan Province